The Last Outpost is a 1935 American adventure film  directed by Charles Barton and Louis J. Gasnier and written by Charles Brackett, Frank Partos and Philip MacDonald. It is based on F. Britten Austin's novel The Drum. The film stars Cary Grant, Claude Rains, Gertrude Michael, Kathleen Burke, Colin Tapley, Margaret Swope and Billy Bevan. The film was released on October 11, 1935, by Paramount Pictures.

Plot
In Kurdistan during World War I, Michael Andrews is a British officer captured by Kurds, imprisoned, and awaiting execution. The local Turkish commander helps Andrews escape and confides that he is a British intelligence officer (initially "Smith," later named as John Stevenson) in disguise. The two set out to warn friendly villagers of a pending Kurdish attack. After a difficult river crossing, and after Andrews flirts with a married tribal woman, Stevenson returns to espionage. Andrews, who has hurt his leg, goes to Cairo for medical treatment. There, Andrews falls in love with his nurse, Rosemary Haydon, who ultimately refuses Andrews by saying that she is secretly married to a man who she had known briefly a few years before.

Andrews transfers to the Sudan, where his patrol takes over a fort after finding that its troops had been massacred. Meanwhile Stevenson goes back to Haydon—revealed as his wife—who confesses her love for Andrews. Stevenson requests a transfer to the Sudan to confront Andrews. Shortly after Stevenson reaches the fort, thousands of African tribesman attack it. Realizing that a handful of men can't hold the fort, Andrews, Stevenson, and their troops set out over sand dunes and eventually enter the jungle with the tribesmen in hot pursuit. British troops appear out of nowhere, deus ex machina, defeat the tribesmen, and rescue Andrews. Stevenson, mortally wounded in the battle, dies a hero's death, presumably leaving Andrews free to marry widow Haydon.

Cast
 Cary Grant as Michael Andrews
 Claude Rains as John Stevenson
 Gertrude Michael as Rosemary Haydon
 Kathleen Burke as Ilya
 Colin Tapley as Lt. Prescott
 Billy Bevan as Cpl. Foster
 Georges Renavent as Turkish major
 Robert Adair as Sergeant in general's office
 Claude King as General
 Olaf Hytten as Doctor
 Frank Elliott as Colonel

Production

Nomadic footage 
The Last Outpost borrows stock footage from earlier productions, notably Merian C. Cooper's 1925 silent ethnographic documentary Grass—A Nation's Battle for Life. The spectacular river-crossing and mountain-climbing scenes are a genuine record, filmed by Cooper, of traditional Bakhtiari migrations in Iran.

Critical response
Writing for The Spectator in 1935, Graham Greene gave a mixed review, describing the first half-hour of the film as "remarkably good" and the remaining 40 minutes as "quite abysmally bad". Greene praised the direction and camerawork of the first part as employing a "fine vigour to present a subject which could not have been presented on the stage", and he praised the acting of both Rains and Grant. The second part of the film (after Grant's character descends the mountain pass to Cairo and Rain's character returns to fight the Kurds) Greene described as "padded out [...] by the addition of a more than usually stupid triangular melodrama of jealousy and last-minute rescue".

References

External links
 

1935 films
1935 adventure films
American historical adventure films
American World War I films
Films based on British novels
Films directed by Charles Barton
Films directed by Louis J. Gasnier
1930s historical adventure films
Films with screenplays by Charles Brackett
Paramount Pictures films
World War I films set in the Middle East
American black-and-white films
Films set in the Ottoman Empire
Films set in Kurdistan
Films set in Cairo
Films set in Sudan
1930s American films
Films scored by Heinz Roemheld
Films scored by Bernhard Kaun